Marie Svan (née Johansson; born 30 June 1963) is a Swedish cross-country skier. She competed in the women's 5 kilometre classical at the 1988 Winter Olympics. She is married to fellow skier Gunde Svan.

Cross-country skiing results
All results are sourced from the International Ski Federation (FIS).

Olympic Games

World Championships

World Cup

Season standings

Individual podiums
 1 podium

Team podiums
 2 podiums

References

External links
 

1963 births
Living people
Swedish female cross-country skiers
Olympic cross-country skiers of Sweden
Cross-country skiers at the 1988 Winter Olympics
People from Rättvik Municipality
20th-century Swedish women